Resnik is a village in the municipality of Bijelo Polje, Montenegro.

Demographics
According to the 2003 census, it has a population of 2,739 people. It is practically merged with nearby Rasovo, and together make a suburb of the town of Bijelo Polje.

According to the 2011 census, its population was 2,967.

References

Populated places in Bijelo Polje Municipality
Serb communities in Montenegro